Erik Douglas Ramanathan is an American attorney, philanthropist, and political fundraiser who is serving as United States ambassador to Sweden under President Joe Biden.

Education 
Ramanathan earned a Bachelor of Arts in behavioral sciences and biology from Johns Hopkins University in 1991 and a Juris Doctor from Harvard Law School in 1996. He was a leader among LGBT activists at Johns Hopkins.

Career 
From 1996 to 2000, Ramanathan worked as an attorney at Proskauer Rose in New York City. From 2000 to 2006, he was the senior vice president, general counsel and CCO of ImClone Systems, which was later acquired by Eli Lilly and Company. From 2001 to 2010, he was chairman of the board of directors of Immigration Equality. He was also a trustee of the Barack Obama 2012 presidential campaign. From 2009 to 2012, Ramanathan was the executive director of the Harvard Law School Center on the Legal Profession and senior fellow from 2013 to 2015. He was co-chair of the finance cabinet for Congressman Seth Moulton's 2016 and 2018 re-election campaigns. He was also a member of the Joe Biden 2020 presidential campaign's national finance committee.

Ambassador to Sweden 
On September 22, 2021, President Joe Biden announced his intent to nominate Ramanathan to be the next United States ambassador to Sweden. On October 4, 2021, his nomination was sent to the Senate. Hearings on his nomination were held before the Senate Foreign Relations Committee on November 2, 2021. On December 15, 2021, his nomination was reported out of committee. On December 18, 2021, his nomination was confirmed in the Senate by voice vote. He presented his credentials on January 20, 2022. His tenure as ambassador has been focused on the Russo-Ukrainian War and Sweden's application for membership in Nato.

Personal 

He is married to Ranesh Ramanathan, a partner in the New York office of Akin Gump Strauss Hauer & Feld. They met when they were both studying organic chemistry at university. He has adopted his partner’s last name. The Boston-based couple has a daughter, Violet, born in 2005 from surrogacy, who as of 2022 attends a high school in Stockholm.

He visited Sweden often prior to becoming U.S. ambassador, enjoying Stockholm nightlife in the summers.

See also
Ambassadors of the United States

References 

Living people
20th-century American lawyers
21st-century American lawyers
Ambassadors of the United States to Sweden
Gay diplomats
Harvard Law School alumni
Johns Hopkins University alumni
LGBT ambassadors of the United States
Massachusetts Democrats
Proskauer Rose people
Year of birth missing (living people)